the notorious xx is a mashup project that pairs the music of Notorious B.I.G. with the debut album of The xx, xx. It was released on the web March 25, 2010 and at a San Francisco listening party. Since its release, the album received one million downloads,  press from thousands of blogs and magazines, including New York Magazine and LA Weekly, and The Guardian called it "the best mashup album of 2010".

Reception
Overall, the album was received very well. Fans voted several of the songs to the top of The Hype Machine's popular chart, New York Magazine called it "really great stuff," Sputnik labeled it "a combination that is sublime,"  and The Guardian noted that it "works amazingly well...impressive.". Members of The xx also mentioned enjoying the album in a number of interviews, and it received attention from NPR, music critic Sasha Frere-Jones of The New Yorker, and Marc Jacobs, among others.

Additionally, there is a video for "juicy-r" that pairs footage from the original videos for Juicy and VCR.

Controversy and takedown
On April 6, 2010 wait what received a takedown request from Warner Music Group. After receiving advice from Girl Talk, Elizabeth Stark, the EFF, and Lawrence Lessig, he complied and removed official download links from his site.

Tracks

References

2010 albums
Mashup albums
Unofficial remix albums